Hjortstamia is a genus of poroid fungi in the family Phanerochaetaceae. It was circumscribed by French mycologists Jacques Boidin and Gilles Liège in 2003. 

The genus name of Hjortstamia is in honour of Kurt Egon Hjortstam (1933 - 2009), who was a Swedish botanist (Mycology) from the University of Gothenburg.

Miettinen and colleagues consider Hjortstamia to be a taxonomy of Phlebiopsis based on molecular phylogenetics.

Species
Hjortstamia bambusicola (Berk. & Broome) Hjortstam & Ryvarden (2005)
Hjortstamia brunneocystidiata (Sheng H.Wu) Sheng H.Wu & Hallenb. (2010)
Hjortstamia castanea Boidin & Gilles (2003)
Hjortstamia friesii (Lév.) Boidin & Gilles (2003)
Hjortstamia fuscomarginata (Burt) Hjortstam & Ryvarden (2008)
Hjortstamia laxa (Sheng H.Wu) Sheng H.Wu & Hallenb. (2010)
Hjortstamia medica (Curr.) Hjortstam & Ryvarden (2005)
Hjortstamia mexicana (A.L.Welden) Boidin & Gilles (2003)
Hjortstamia monomitica (G.Cunn.) Hjortstam & Ryvarden (2005)
Hjortstamia novae-granata (A.L.Welden) Hjortstam & Ryvarden (2008)
Hjortstamia percomis (Berk. & Broome) Boidin & Gilles (2003)
Hjortstamia perplexa (D.A.Reid) Boidin & Gilles (2003)
Hjortstamia rimosissima (Berk. & M.A.Curtis) Boidin & Gilles (2003)

References

Phanerochaetaceae
Polyporales genera
Taxa described in 2003